Statistics of the Brunei Premier League for the 2003 season.

Overview
It was contested by 20 teams, and Wijaya FC won the championship.

On 5 October, Wijaya beat Indera in their final match of the season courtesy of a solitary Norsillmy Taha goal. DPMM FC would win the championship if they produced the same result against ABDB the following day, as they had a superior goal difference to Wijaya's in their identical league win–loss record.

On 6 October, ABDB beat DPMM 3-1 through a penalty by future DPMM captain Rosmin Kamis followed by goals scored by Sardillah Abdullah and Samdani Judin to hand the title to Wijaya.

First stage

Group A

Group B

Second stage

References

Brunei 2003 (RSSSF)

Brunei Premier League seasons
Brunei
Brunei
1